Greg Peach (born November 19, 1986) is a professional Canadian football defensive end who is currently a free-agent. He was most recently a member of the Winnipeg Blue Bombers. He was originally signed by the Edmonton Eskimos as a street free agent in 2009. He played college football at Eastern Washington and was the 2008 recipient of the Buck Buchanan Award. Peach has also been a member of the Hamilton Tiger-Cats and Winnipeg Blue Bombers of the Canadian Football League..

High school career
Greg graduated from Evergreen High School where he was named a First Team All-State selection by the Tacoma News Tribune as a defensive lineman. He also played basketball while at Evergreen.

College career
Peach had a career-best senior season in 2008, ending the year with 72 defensive tackles (35 solo), 23.5 tackles for loss, 18 sacks, one pass broken up and one fumble recovery in 11 games (11 starts). His outstanding efforts that season earned him the Buck Buchanan Award, honoring the Division I Football Championship Subdivision's top defensive player. He ended his collegiate career with 35.5 sacks, which established a new record for career sacks in school history. Peach also set school records for most tackles for a loss in a season (28) and career (63).

Professional career

Edmonton Eskimos
Peach signed with the Edmonton Eskimos of the Canadian Football League as a free agent in 2009. In his 3 seasons with the Eskimos, Peach has recorded a total of 94 tackles and 13 sacks. He was not re-signed by the Eskimos following the 2011 CFL season.

Hamilton Tiger-Cats
He signed with the Hamilton Tiger-Cats as a free agent on February 18, 2012. In his first season with the Tiger-Cats he amassed 36 tackles and 6 sacks. He was injured for much of the first half of the 2013 CFL season, leading to his release on August 28, 2013.

Winnipeg Blue Bombers 
Peach was signed by the Winnipeg Blue Bombers and played 6 games for them to close out the 2013 season. In his second season with the club Peach had the best year of his career, amassing 46 tackles, 7 quarterback sacks and 2 forced fumbles (all personal bests). The Bombers defense struggled in 2015 to generate pressure on the quarterback, and this was reflected in Peach's statline as he finished the season with only 1 sack in 11 games. On February 18 2016 the Bombers announced they had released Greg Peach from his contract.

References

External links
 Winnipeg Blue Bombers bio 
Hamilton Tiger-Cats biography

1986 births
Living people
American players of Canadian football
Canadian football defensive linemen
Eastern Washington Eagles football players
Edmonton Elks players
Hamilton Tiger-Cats players
Sportspeople from Vancouver, Washington
Players of American football from Washington (state)
Winnipeg Blue Bombers players